Numidian was a language spoken in ancient Numidia, a territory covering much of northern Africa. The script in which it was written, the Libyco-Berber alphabet (from which Tifinagh descended), has been almost fully deciphered and most characters (apart from a few exceptions restricted to specific areas) have known values. Despite this, the language has barely been deciphered and only a few words are known. Libyco-Berber inscriptions are attested from the 3rd century BC to the 3rd century AD. The language is scarcely attested and can be confidently identified only as belonging to the Afroasiatic family, although it was most likely part of the Berber languages, spoken at the start of the breakup of the Proto-Berber language.

Dialects and relation to other ancient languages

Dialects and foreign influences 
It is known that there was an orthographical difference between the western and eastern Numidian language. Starting at Kabylia, which was a kind of mixed region, the regions to the east all the way to what is modern day Tunisia used the east-Libyc writing system, while the regions to the west all the way to approximately the Moulouya river spoke the western Numidian dialect, and used the larger and still undecoded west-Libyc writing system. The East-Numidian dialect was much more influenced by the Punic language than the West-Numidian, and West-Numidian is thought to be more ancient than East-Numidian. Numidian was influenced mostly by Punic and then Roman, although Numidian and even some modern Berber vocabulary seem to have been also slightly influenced by the Paleohispanic languages and possibly by other Pre-Indo-European languages.

Other ancient Berber or Berber-like languages 
Not much is known about the variations of the old Libyc language(s) as none of them have been fully deciphered, and outside of some east-Numidian steles none of the various Old Libyc writings have been interpreted. It may be possible that the language of the neighbouring Mauri people of modern-day Morocco may have been a dialect of the larger Numidian, although there are little to no sources or researches into the language. If Numidian was a Berber language then it is known that by that stage the breakup of Proto-Berber into various Berber languages was still not fully complete, and thus the ancient Berber languages of the time were very similar to each other, even more so than the modern ones. In circa 500 B.C various nomadic Berber groups penetrated the Sahara from the north, corresponding the area of the later Gaetulians. Although the area where these nomads lived yielded no writing and thus is incomparable to Numidian, it is known that Pliny the Elder described the Saharan Gaetulian language as very similar or the same as the Numidian one, implying that the Gaetulian language may have been a dialect of Numidian.

Not much is known of the Numidian language, and even less of Berber or Proto-Berber languages and dialects at this time, although it is known that for example the language of the native Berbers of Cyrenaica contained many Greek loanwords according to Herodotus. It is also unknown whether the Mauretanian language of the neighbouring Kingdom of Mauretania in what is approximately modern day Morocco formed a part of the Numidian language, or was a separate language from it, as there has been as of yet no major efforts into decoding it, and there are no known sources describing it.

Categorization and reconstruction 
As the Massylii, who spoke the language, were ethnically Berber, it is supposed that Numidian was therefore a Berber language. The Berber branch of Afro-Asiatic is sometimes called Libyco-Berber since it is not certain whether Numidian would fall within the modern Berber languages or form a sister branch to them. Some theorize that it constituted a group of its own, as there is no trace of the noun-case system shared by the modern Berber languages. However, Proto-Berber is theorized to have no grammatical case either, which would also imply a later addition of the system. The Lybico-Berber tifinagh and the Phoenician alphabet being abjads without vowels complicates the matter even more.

Work on deciphering the language has not been decisive, although especially recently some tried to reconstruct words by comparing Numidian script to proto and modern Berber languages. Most remaining scripts are funerary, and follow the formula of "X w-Y" (X son of Y). BNS is also an often returning words in this script, which probably meant "tomb of". Many words had an H at the end of them, the function of which is unclear. A few gravestones show a different word between the two personal names, plausibly interpreted as a kinship term based on Berber comparisons: wlt "daughter (of)" (modern Berber wəlt), and, more rarely, mt "mother (of)" (modern Tuareg ma). Similar to the modern berber languages, the ta-...-t circumfix signified feminine version of the word with a silent h added to the end. In the Dougga inscriptions some political positions are mentioned, such as "gld" (lord) which based on this technique, can be translated into the modern berber word "agellid" which originates from the proto-berber word "*a-gəllid". A few verbs have been unambiguously identified in the various inscriptions. Comparison with modern Berber suggests that ṣkn, probably read as "eṣ(ə)k-n based on modern berber comparison which means"built" is to be analysed as ṣk "build" plus -n, marking 3pl subject agreement (-ən).

An example of translation using this method can be demonstrated on a part of a Numidian inscription which is read as "Msnsn. gldt. w-gjj." "Msnsn" is the name of king Massinissa while "gldt" is the word for king. Finally, "w-gjj" means "son of Gaia". Thus by attempting to translate the Numidian text through modern and proto-Berber the inscription would read "Massinissa the king, son of Gaia".

Numidian also featured and shared most or all of its prepositions "n" (of) and "d" (and) with modern Berber, along with various prefixes, such as "ta...-t", "m-" etc. with modern Berber.

These facts would strongly suggest that Numidian is a now extinct branch of the Berber languages, although some linguists believe that Numidian is not an ancestor but an extinct sister branch to the modern surviving Berber languages.

If the translations of "SBS" (asebbas) in the thugga inscription as "year" is correct then that would mean the Proto-Berber form "ww" which evolved into "gg" or "gʷ" in most modern Berber languages was "bb" or "bʷ" in Numidian. This is only found in the Zenaga language of Mauritania in modern times. As Zenaga was one of the first Berber languages to split off from the Proto-Berber group and thus still possesses many ancient characteristics, along with the Numidian usage of this form, could suggest that in the evolution of berber languages "ww" turned into "bʷ" and then into "gʷ".

Naming conventions 
Numidian names generally often followed a complicated, but well documented naming convention of Berber antiquity and medieval times. While this wasn't always the case, this was especially true for nobles or higher leaders. The way it worked was simple: Verb in the 3rd person + personal pronouns as an affix (direct or indirect) in 3rd person plural form (he/she-X-they/of them).

For example, the actual name of Jughurta most likely sounded as "y-uger-ten" (he who surpasses them), while the name of king Massinissa (MSNSN in Libyco-Berber) was "mas-nsen" (their seignor). Much  of the onomastic work on the Numidian language was done by Salem Chaker, who through his work also help in decoding a few words in the language through dissecting known names.

Known words 
Here is a comparison of the few known Numidian words to modern Northern Berber languages and the Tamashek language. Normalized words with vowels added are written in the brackets. Underlined words are based on etymologic or onomastic reconstructions from Numidian names.

This comparison suggests that Numidian may be closest to the modern Northern Berber languages such as the Zenati languages, Shilha language, and the Kabyle language although the modern northern Berber languages have gone through grammatical changes, and they have also taken loanwords from Arabic, Latin, and French. Kabyle may be the closest to Numidian, but has absorbed loanwords and phrases from the other languages mentioned.

According to many linguists the H at the end of many numidian words were either silent or disappeared by modern times, or that in many cases such as MSWH or MWSNH was possibly used as a replacement for, or possibly was the ancestor of the modern berber ɣ sound.

Thugga inscription 
The Thugga inscription is the longest known Numidian inscription as of yet, and has served with the most clues regarding the language.

Numidian script

ṢKN•TBGG•BNYFŠ•MSNSN•GLDṮ•WGYY•GLDṮ•WZLLSN•ŠFṬ

SBSNDH•GLDṮ•SYSH•GLD•MKWSN

ŠFṬ•GLDṮ•WFŠN•MWSNG•ŠNK•WBNY•WŠNK•DŠFṬ•WM

WTNKW•MṢṢKW•MGN•WYRŠTB•WSDYLN•GẒB•MGN•WŠFṬ•MW

WŠMN•GLDṮ•GLDGMYL•ZMR•WMSNF•WŠMN•GLDMṢK•M

WŠYN•GLDṮ•WMGN•GLDṮ•ṬNYN•ŠYN•WNKKN•WFṬŠ•DR

ŠFṬ•WŠNK•

Normalization and adding of known or possible vowels

əṣk(ə)-n Tubgag BNYFŠ[?] Masnsen a-gəllidṯ u-Gayya a-gəllidṯ u-Zelalsen šufeṭ

Asəbbas NDH a-gəllidṯ(?) s-yusa a-gəllid Mikiwsan

Translation from Punic

The people of Thugga built this temple for Masinissa the King son of Gaia the King son of Zilalsan the Judge, in the tenth year since Micipsa ruled, in the year of Shufet the King son of Afshan the King, The Centurion: Shanok son of Banay and Shufet son of Magon son of Tanaku. The ms s kwy Magon son of Yirashtan son of Sadyalan, and gzby: Magon son of Shufet the Centurion son of Abdeshmun the King. Erectors of this property: Ashyan son of Ankikan son of Patash and Arash son of Shufet son of Shanok.

Example texts 
These texts are examples of bilingual inscriptions with known meanings, most of which are funerary texts

Bilingual texts

Cenotaph inscription 
Punic

[mn]ṣbt š'ṭbn bn ypmṭt bn plw

hbnm š'bnm ʕb'rš bn ʕbdštrt

zmr bn 'ṭbn bn ypmṭt bn plw

mngy bn wrsbn

wb'zrt šl' **t* zzy wṭmn wwrskn

hḥršm šyr msdl bn nnpsn w'nkn b[n] 'šy

hnskm šbrzl špṭ bll wppy bn bby

Punic to English translation

The monument of 'ṭbn son of Ypmṭt son of Plw. 

Builders of the stones: ʕb'rš son of ʕbdštrt;

Zmr son of 'ṭbn son of Ypmṭt son of Plw;

Mngy son of Wrsbn. 

And for its ???, Zzy son of Ṭmn and Wrskn. 

Workers of the wood: Msdl son of Nnpsn and 'nkn son of 'šy.

Casters of the iron: Šfṭ son of Bll and Ppy son of Bby.

Numidian

****N WYFMṬT W*******DRŠ WWDŠTR

*****BN WYFMṬṮ WFLW

MNGY WWRSKN

KSLNS ŻŻY WṬMN WRSKN

NBBN NŠ[Q]RH MSDL WNNFSN NKN WŠY

NB*N NZLH ŠFṬ WBLL FFY WBBY

Normalization and adding of known or possible vowels

Aṭeban w-Yefmaṭat w-Falu****D'rš w-Wadaštar

Zamir w-Aṭeban w-Yefmaṭat w-Falu

Mangy w-Wareskan

KSLNS Żaży w-Ṭaman w-Raskn

inababen n a-šɣarh Masdil w-Nanafsen Naken w-šy

inababen (?) n uzzal Šufeṭ w-Balil Fafy W-Beby

Kef Beni Fredj inscriptions 
Latin

SACTUT•IHIMIR F•VIXIT•ANORVM•LXX H[SE]

Latin to English

Sactut son of Ihimir lived 70 years. [He is buried here.]

Numidian

ZKTT WYMR MTYBLH MSWH MNKDH

Normalization and adding of known or possible vowels

Zaktut w-Iymir MTYBLH amsiweɣ amenkad

Possible Numidian to English translation

Zaktut son of Iyimir MTYLBH soldier of the emperor.

See also 
 Punic-Libyan Inscription, which helped decoding the Libyco-Berber script

Notes 
Meaning either "the good one" or the "resting one".

References

Aikhenvald & Militarev, 1991. 'Livijsko-guanchskie jazyki', Jazyki Azii i Afriki, vol. 4, pp. 148–266.

Extinct languages of Africa
Languages of Africa
Languages of Algeria
Languages of Morocco
Languages of Tunisia
Numidia
Unclassified languages of Africa